, more commonly known as K.K. Slider or K.K., is a fictional character within the Animal Crossing franchise. One of the franchise's most popular characters, he debuted in the title Animal Crossing, and has appeared in every installment since. K.K.'s main role is as a musician who performs to the townsfolk, through live performances and purchasable in-game albums. He is based on Nintendo video game voice actor and composer Kazumi Totaka – his Japanese name "Totakeke" being a contraction of "Totaka K." – and has been said to be an animal caricature of Totaka.

K.K. Slider has also appeared outside of Animal Crossing several times, such as a costume for the player's Mii fighter in the crossover fighting games Super Smash Bros. for Nintendo 3DS and Wii U and Super Smash Bros. Ultimate.

Appearances and role in the series
K.K. Slider was first introduced in the franchise's debut title Dōbutsu no Mori for the Nintendo 64 in Japan. His role within the game is as a guitarist who performs songs for the player and townsfolk if requested, and, once finished, gives the player a virtual copy of the song that can be played on a radio in their home. This role remains virtually the same throughout every main series Animal Crossing title with minor changes, up until Animal Crossing: New Leaf, in which he also takes the role of a DJ under the pseudonym DJ KK. He also has minor roles in Animal Crossing: Happy Home Designer, Amiibo Festival with an amiibo figurine, Pocket Camp, New Horizons, and in the 2006 film Dōbutsu no Mori. In October 2019, K.K. Slider – in the form of a hologram – opened for a Splatoon concert that took place during Nintendo Live in Tokyo, Japan K.K. Slider has also received a costume for the player's Mii Fighter in the crossover fighting games Super Smash Bros. for Nintendo 3DS and Wii U and Super Smash Bros. Ultimate, as well as his own amiibo.

Animal Crossing: New Horizons 
K.K. Slider will appear in the game after the player's island receives a three-star rating. After that, K.K. Slider will appear every Saturday (unless there is a special event) and accept requests for his songs. Four new K.K. songs were added in New Horizons, with 12 additional songs being added in the game's 2.0 update.

In the Happy Home Paradise DLC, DJ KK will appear on the main archipelago once the player has constructed thirty homes and designed all five facilities. A concert related to his appearance in the DLC was held in October 2022.

Reception
UGO.com named him the second best Animal Crossing character. On separate occasions, Kotaku considered the character to be one of the "most awesome video game dog companions" and described him as "the most influential musician of our generation". Nintendo Life wanted K.K. Slider to appear in the then-upcoming video game Animal Crossing: New Horizons. Polygon described K.K. Slider as a "fan fave". Thegamer ranked K.K. Slider as their favorite Animal Crossing character and said that "We love K.K. for so many things, including his laid-back persona, boppin' music, and his overall groovy vibes." Softonic.com listed K.K. Slider as one of the "10 coolest dogs in video games". K.K. Slider came in first place in a "popularity poll" by Nintendo Japan. Cameron Faulkner of The Verge stated that K.K. Slider was his favorite artist of 2020. Abby Lee Hood of Nintendo Life observed K.K. Slider was a breakout character for his music appearing through remixes, social media videos and TikTok.

References

Animal Crossing characters
Anthropomorphic dogs
Video game characters introduced in 2001
Musician characters in video games
Fictional guitarists
Fictional DJs
Video game characters based on real people
Male characters in video games